Bigend Saddle is a snow-covered saddle at the southwest side of Mount Betty in northern Herbert Range, Queen Maud Mountains. The saddle was traversed in December 1929 by the Byrd Antarctic Expedition geological party under Laurence Gould. It was named by the Southern Party of the New Zealand Geological Survey Antarctic Expedition, 1963–64, because one of the party's motor toboggans was abandoned here with a smashed big end bearing.

References
 

Mountain passes of the Ross Dependency
Amundsen Coast